Mistake(s) may refer to:

 An error

Law
 Mistake (contract law), an erroneous belief, at contracting, that certain facts are true
 Mistake in English contract law, a specific type of mistake, pertaining to England
 Mistake (criminal law), or mistake of fact, a defense to criminal charges on the grounds of ignorance of a fact
 Mistake of law, a defense to criminal charges on the grounds of ignorance of law
 Error (law)

Places
 Mistake Bay, a bay in Canada
 Mistake Crag, a crag in Antarctica
 Mistake Creek, Queensland, an Australian locality
 Mistake Peak, a mountain in Antarctica
 Mistake Peak (Arizona), a mountain in the U.S. state of Arizona
 Mistake River, a river in New Zealand

Music
 Mistake (album), a 2002 album by D+
 "Mistake" (Moby song), 2009
 "Mistake" (Stephanie McIntosh song), 2006
 "Mistake" (Mike Oldfield song), 1982
 "Mistakes" (Brian McFadden song), a 2010 song featuring Delta Goodrem
 "Mistakes" (Tove Styrke song), 2017
 "Mistakes" (Don Williams song), 1982
 "Mistake", by Big Wreck from the album The Pleasure and the Greed
 "Mistake", by Demi Lovato from her album Unbroken
 "Mistake", by Girls' Generation from the 2010 EP Hoot
 "Mistake", by Shinhwa from Winter Story, 2003
 "Mistake", a 2016 single by Drug Restaurant
 "Mistakes", by Blue October UK from Preaching Lies to the Righteous, 2001
 "Mistakes", by Godsmack from Awake, 2000
 "Mistakes", by Kutless from Hearts of the Innocent, 2006

Others
 Mistake (1953 film), an Iranian film
 Mistake (2013 film), a Bengali drama film
 The Mistake (film), a 1913 American silent drama film
 Mistakes (film), a 2021 Czech film
 "The Mistake" (House), an episode of the TV series House

See also
 The Mistake (disambiguation)
 Mistaken (disambiguation)
 Mistake Mistake Mistake Mistake, a 2006 album by James Figurine
 MST3K (Mystery Science Theater 3000), an American television comedy series
 Error (disambiguation)